The 1999 Heineken Open Shanghai was a men's tennis tournament played on outdoor hard courts in Shanghai, China that was part of the World Series of the 1999 ATP Tour. It was the fourth edition of the tournament and was held from 4 October through 11 October 1999. Second-seeded Magnus Norman won the singles title.

Finals

Singles
 Magnus Norman defeated  Marcelo Ríos 2–6, 6–3, 7–5
 It was Norman's 5th singles title of the year and the 7th of his career.

Doubles
 Sébastien Lareau /  Daniel Nestor defeated  Todd Woodbridge /  Mark Woodforde 7–5, 6–3
 It was Lareau's 5th doubles title of the year and the 12th of his career. It was Nestor's 2nd doubles title of the year and the 12th of his career.

References

External links
 ITF tournament edition details

Heineken Open Shanghai
Kingfisher Airlines Tennis Open